Matthias Lebeer is a Belgian director of films and TV commercials. His first short film was shortlisted for an Oscars award in 2008. He lives in London.

Early life and education 

Lebeer was born in Antwerp, Belgium on 5 April 1984.

He received his bachelor's degree in 2005 from FAMU, in Prague, Czech Republic.

Lebeer also has two master's degrees: one in film directing (2006) from the Royal Institute for Theatre, Cinema & Sound in Brussels; and one in film production (2008) from L’Institut des Arts de Diffusion, Belgium.

Career 
Matthias's graduation project, Brod Ludaka, was shortlisted for an Oscar in 2008 after he won Best Director at the Athens International Film Festival (Ohio).

In the same year he directed his first commercial for Textappeal, which was presented at the Cannes Lions. Following this early success, Matthias signed with La Pac (Paris), In Case of Fire (Amsterdam), and TRS (Brussels) for directing advertising films. He moved to London in the summer of 2011.

Since then he has been a freelance director for many TV commercials of brands including Google, Nespresso, McDonald's, Star Alliance, Samsung, McLaren, Nissan and Volvo. He has won several awards for his work, including two Gold Cannes Lions and both Silver and Bronze at the 2016 EVCOM Screen Awards

He is best known for his commercial films, but has also made award-winning music videos and continues to develop his narrative portfolio. He recently completed Alan, a short film supported by the BFI and IdeasTap.

Filmography 
 Alan (2016)
Wherever I Go by Mark Knopfler (2015)
 Nissan GT Academy (2014)
 GT Academy Europe (2012/2013)
 Brod Ludaka (2006)

Awards and nominations 
 EVCOM Screen Awards, Silver & Bronze for Atelier Nespresso (2016)
 Talenthouse Award & The Smalls Music Video Award for Mark Knopfler Wherever I Go (2015)
 Cannes Lions, Gold for Best Use of Branded Content for GT Academy (2012)
 Cannes Lions, Gold for Best Use of Branded Content for GT Academy (2011)
 Oscar Shortlist for Brod Ludaka (2008)
 Best Director, Athens International Film and Video Festival, Ohio, USA (2007)

References

External links 
 
 

Belgian film directors
Mass media people from Antwerp
Academy of Performing Arts in Prague alumni
1984 births
Living people